Goolboo is a rural locality in the Cassowary Coast Region, Queensland, Australia.

History 
The locality takes its name from a former railway station name, which in turn was named by the Queensland Railways Department on 4 December 1924 using an Aboriginal word meaning magpie.

References 

Cassowary Coast Region
Localities in Queensland